The 1912 Kentucky Derby was the 38th running of the Kentucky Derby. The race took place on May 11, 1912.

Full results

Winning Breeder: R. H. McCarter Potter; (KY)
Horses The Manager and Patruche scratched before the race.

Payout

 The winner received a purse of $4,850.
 Second place received $700.
 Third place received $300.

References

1912
Kentucky Derby
Derby
May 1912 sports events